The Alfa Romeo 135 Tornado was an Italian 18-cylinder radial engine designed by Giustino Cattaneo in 1934–1935.

Design and development
The Alfa 135 consists of two nine-cylinder radial rows, back to back, operating a two-throw crankshaft. Cattaneo left Alfa Romeo in 1936, leaving the development of the 135 to eng. Bossi and his staff, but without success.

Despite the obvious potential, this engine was affected by many reliability problems. Although many mechanical defects were addressed during testing, it suffered from overheating and vibrations so seriously that it was rejected from service. Up to 1944 approximately 150 were made, none of which were fitted in operational aircraft.

Further development resulted in the Alfa Romeo 136, but this remained a paper project before the Armistice in September 1943 intervened.

Applications
Cant Z.1018 "Leone"
Savoia-Marchetti SM.87 (four planes)
Savoia-Marchetti SM.82 (central engine)
Savoia-Marchetti SM.90 (one prototype)
Cant Z 1014 (five prototypes)
Focke-Wulf Fw 200 "Condor" (135 R.C.34 engines supplied for testing)
CRDA CANT Z.1018 "Leone" (136 R.C.25)

Variants
136 R.C.25 Experimental derivative of the 135, probably not built,  at sea level,    at 
135 R.C.32 
135 R.C.34 
135 R.C.45
136 R.C.65 Experimental derivative of the 135, probably not built,  for Take Off,  at 
136 R.C.100Rated at

Specifications (135 R.C.32)

See also

References

Alfa Romeo aircraft engines
Aircraft air-cooled radial piston engines
1930s aircraft piston engines